Grammarian may refer to:

 Alexandrine grammarians, philologists and textual scholars in Hellenistic Alexandria in the 3rd and 2nd centuries BCE
 Biblical grammarians, scholars who study the Bible and the Hebrew language
 Grammarian (Greco-Roman), a teacher in the second stage in the traditional education system
 Linguist, a scientist who studies language
 Philologist, a scholar of literary criticism, history, and language
 Sanskrit grammarian, scholars who studied the grammar of Sanskrit
 Speculative grammarians or Modistae, a 13th and 14th century school of philosophy
 Grammarians of Basra, scholars of Arabic
 Grammarians of Kufa, scholars of Arabic

See also
 Grammar, the structural rules that govern natural languages
 Grammaticus, a name used by several scholars
 Neogrammarian, a German school of philology in the late 19th century